Dragun is a municipality in the Nordwestmecklenburg district, in Mecklenburg-Vorpommern, Germany.

References

Nordwestmecklenburg
Grand Duchy of Mecklenburg-Schwerin